Udaan is an Indian soap opera that premiered on Colors TV on 18 August 2014, replacing Madhubala. Produced by Mahesh Bhatt, it was originally planned as a film which was eventually shelved.Udaan is the one of the longest running television show of Colors TV The story revolves around Chakor, a victim of bonded child labour who fights for her village's freedom and aspires to break-free. It starred Spandan Chaturvedi as Child Chakor until it took a generation leap in February 2016 & actress Meera Deosthale was roped in to play the role of adult Chakor.

Plot 
Kamal Narayan, a wealthy landlord in Azadganj village, uses the villagers as bonded labourers. Couple Bhuvan Singh and Kasturi face financial difficulty; as collateral for a loan, they has to let Kamal use their unborn child as a servant. Then, Kasturi gives birth to a girl and names her Chakor.

7 years later
Chakor, now a bonded labourer, is an aspiring marathon runner and has a younger sister, Imli. She befriends Kamal's nephew, Vivaan and campaigns for the villagers' rights. Unaware, she also has a twin sister, Chunni, who was secretly raised in Mumbai. Kamal kills Chunni, motivating Chakor to seek revenge. She escapes with her marathon coach to pursue her dreams and vows to return to the village in 10 years. Vengeful for the betrayal, Kamal gets Chakor's grandmother buried alive.

10 years later
Chakor returns after becoming a famous marathon runner. Imli hates her for leaving them all behind. Chakor learns about her grandmother's death and gets Kamal and his son, Suraj arrested. Vivaan and Chakor fall in love while Imli falls for Suraj.

However, Suraj comes back as he promised to be a government witness against his father's deeds. Later, Kamal tries to kill him for his betrayal but he escapes with the help of Chakor, Imli and Vivaan. Suraj, whose marriage is arranged to Tina Raichand, also impregnates Imli. A double ceremony is planned for both Suraj and Vivaan. Imli explains this to Chakor who conspires to switch places in the ceremony. Suraj shows his cruelty by switching them, marrying Imli to Vivaan while he marries Chakor. Imli miscarries and later Vivaan and Imli fall in love. Kamal Narayan returns and forces Suraj to be a bonded laborer. In the process to set him free, Chakor and Suraj also realize their love for each other.
 
Imli turns evil and gives Vivaan a sleeping pill, putting him into coma. She also conspires with Kamal to have kill Chakor, which presumably succeeds. Chakor survives and learns that she's pregnant with Suraj's child. Suraj finds Chakor and they reunite and return to Azadganj, after forgiving Imli. Kamal kidnaps Chakor and she miscarries. In return, Chakor kills Kamal to avenge the deaths of her family and his prior sins. She gets jailed for 5 years elsewhere Imli hits Suraj with an iron rod, causing him to lose his memory.

5 years later
Chakor is released and shocked to learn Imli's truth. She's hurt when Suraj fails to recognize her as he has lost his memory. Chakor motivates villagers to fight back against Imli and Ranvijay's cruelty. One day when Ranvijay tries to kill Chakor, Suraj regains his memories and saves Chakor. They reunite and the couple shares some romantic moments together. Eventually, Chakor becomes pregnant with Suraj's child and gives him the good news. They both come up with a plan and expose Imli and Ranvijay. Imli tries to injure Chakor but Suraj saves her at the right moment and tells her that he regained his memories and Chakor is his wife and she's pregnant with his unborn child. Imli has an accident and is presumed dead.

1.5 years later
Chakor and Suraj lead a happy life with their baby daughter, Saanvi. Imli returns and tries to create rift in their relationship. Chakor suspects that Imli is alive.

Vivaan also comes back leaving both Suraj and Chakor shocked as they thought he died 7 years ago. Vivaan also believes that Imli is alive igniting Chakor's doubt about the same. Eventually, They find Imli and locks her in a room. Gun dealer Yashwant tries to kill Suraj; when Vivaan gets in the way, Chakor accidentally shoots him to death. Imli swears revenge and kidnaps Saanvi and fakes her death. Suraj blames Chakor for their daughter getting abducted and severs ties with her. They both leave the village: Suraj moves to New York while Chakor moves to a different town. Meanwhile, Imli makes Saanvi a bonded labourer.

7 years later
Both Chakor and Suraj return to village for work and form a bond with Saanvi, who's now known as Anjor, unaware of the fact that she's their daughter. Imli finally tells them the truth and an apologetic Suraj reconciles with Chakor and Saanvi. Suraj is killed in a bomb-blast, a result of a political fallout. Chakor, pays Suraj's look-alike, Raghav Khanna to take Suraj's place, rather than telling the truth to Saanvi and family. Imli turns good and dies while saving Chakor life. Chakor gets jailed for 10 years under false charges and Saanvi is adopted by a rich couple.

10 years later
Chakor traces her daughter and tries to get close to her. The rich couple tries to separate them and kills Raghav, causing Saanvi to leave them. Saanvi marries Sameer and they move to Sitapur. Sameer is brutally killed by Ranvijay, who had helped Imli in earlier. Chakor and Saanvi unite to get revenge and Ranvijay is burnt alive. Finally, Chakor comes back to Azadganj as Saanvi decides to stay in Sitapur.

Cast

Main
 Meera Deosthale / Toral Rasputra as Chakor Suraj Rajvanshi: Marathon runner; Kasturi and Bhuvan's eldest daughter; Chunni and Imli's sister; Vivaan's childhood friend ; Suraj's wife; Saanvi's mother (2016–2019) / (2019)
 Spandan Chaturvedi as
 Child Chakor "Chauka" Singh (2014–2016)
 Chunni Singh: Kasturi and Bhuvan's second daughter; Chakor and Imli's sister (2015) (Dead)
 Vijayendra Kumeria as 
 Suraj Rajvanshi: Tejaswini and Kamal's son; Bhagya and Ragini's brother; Chakor's husband; Saanvi's father (2016–2018) (Dead)
 Darshan Gurjar / Apurva Jyotir as Teenage Suraj Rajvanshi (2014–2016)
 Raghav Khanna: Suraj's lookalike; Chakor's helper (2018–2019) (Dead)
 Vidhi Pandya as Imli Singh Rajvanshi: Kasturi and Bhuvan's youngest daughter; Chakor and Chunni's sister; Ranvijay's ex-wife; Vivaan's widow (2016–2019) (Dead)
 Tasheen Shah as Child Imli Singh (2014–2016)
 Paras Arora as Vivaan Rajvanshi: Ranjana and Manohar's son; Bhagya, Suraj and Ragini's cousin; Chakor's childhood friend; Imli's late husband (2016–2018) (Dead)
 Wahib Kapadia as Child Vivaan Rajvanshi
 Tanya Sharma as Saanvi "Anjor" Rajvanshi Sharma: Chakor and Suraj's daughter; Jatin and Poonam's adopted daughter; Sameer's widow (2019)
 Samriddhi Yadav as Child Saanvi "Anjor" Rajvanshi (2018–2019)
 Aadhya Barot as Baby Saanvi Rajvanshi (2018)
 Gaurav Sareen as Sameer Sharma: Jaya and Manoj's son; Vanshika's brother; Abhiraj's cousin; Saanvi's husband (2019) (Dead)

Recurring
 Sai Ballal as Kamal Narayan Rajvanshi: Shakuntala's son; Manohar, Nayantara and Bharat's brother; Tejaswini and Ranjana's ex-husband; Bhagya, Suraj and Ragini's father; Chakor's arch enemy; Saanvi's grandfather (2014–2017) (Dead)
 Vikas Bhalla as ACP Ranvijay Singh: Malini and Rajan's son; Kavya and Preeti's brother; Kamal, Chakor and Suraj's arch enemy; Imli's former husband (2017–18, 2019) (Dead)
 Prachee Pathak as Tejaswini Desai Rajvanshi: Ramesh's sister; Kamal's first wife; Bhagya, Suraj and Ragini's mother; Saanvi's grandmother (2014–2019) (Dead)
 Sai Deodhar as Kasturi Singh: Bhuvan's wife; Chakor, Chunni and Imli's mother; Saanvi's grandmother (2014–2018)
 Rajiv Kumar as Bhuvan Singh: Savitri's son; Kasturi's Husband; Chakor, Chunni and Imli's father; Saanvi's grandfather (2014–2018)
 Vineet Raina as Arjun Khanna: Mahesh's brother; Chakor's sports coach; Bhagya's husband (2014–2016)
 Sandeep Baswana as Collector Ishwar Rawat: Kamal's enemy; Abha's husband; Aditya's father (2014–2015) (Dead)
 Dolphin Dwivedi as Abha Ishwar Rawat: Ishwar's wife; Aditya's mother (2014–2015)
 Varun Sharma as Aditya Rawat: Abha and Ishwar's son; Chakor's friend (2016)
 Yash Mistry as Young Aditya Rawat (2014–2015)
 Rishina Kandhari as Vishakha (2015–2016)
 Sheetal Pandya as Bhagya Rajvanshi Khanna: Tejaswini and Kamal's elder daughter; Suraj and Ragini's sister; Vivaan, Amit, Jyoti, Vaani, Gumaan, Mahendra, Narendra and Arvind's cousin; Arjun's wife (2015–2016)
 Amit Dolawat as Mahesh Khanna: Arjun's brother (2015–2016)
 Ginnie Virdi as Ranjana Rajvanshi: Manohar and Kamal's former wife; Vivaan's mother (2014–2017) (Dead)
 Moni Rai as Manohar Rajvanshi: Shakuntala's son; Kamal, Nayanatara and Bharat's brother; Ranjana's first husband; Vivaan's father (2014–2016) (Dead)
 Prakash Ramchandani as Lakhan Singh: Kamal's henchman; Chagan's father (2014–2017)
 Shresth Kumar as Chagan Singh: Lakhan's son; Chakor's friend; Gauri's husband (2016–2018)
 Sunidhi Chauhan as Gauri Singh: Chagan's wife (2017–2018)
 Jhuma Biswas as Savitri Devi Singh: Bhuvan's mother; Chakor, Chunni and Imli's grandmother (2014–2016) (Dead)
 Suhasini Mulay as Shakuntala Devi Rajvanshi: Kamal, Manohar, Nayantara and Bharat's mother; Bhagya, Gumaan, Suraj, Ragini, Mahendra, Narendra and Vaani's grandmother (2014–2015)
 Jineet Rath as Om (2014–2015)
 Deep Kaur as Swarnaa Rawat (2014–2016)
 Roma Bali as Vaibhavi Deshmukh (2015) (Dead)
 Naveen Sharma as Rakesh "Rocky" Deshmukh (2015–2016)
 Vijay Aidasani as Samarithan Prabhakar Rawat (2014–2015)
 Mak Mukesh Tripathi as Roney (2015–2016)
 Nishikant Dixit as Principal Dharampal Chauhan (2015–2016)
 Sandeep Nuval as Shikhu (2016–2018)
 Vaishnavi Shukla as Young Ragini Rajvanshi (2014–2016)
 Vandana Singh as Ragini Rajvanshi: Tejaswini and Kamal's daughter; Bhagya and Suraj's sister; Gumaan, Vivaan, Mahendra, Narendra, Vaani, Amit, Arvind and Jyoti's cousin (2016–2018)
 Vinny Arora as Tina Raichand: Marathon runner; Chakor's competitor (2016)
 Sehban Azim as Inspector Ajay Khurana (2017)
 Unknown as Rajan Pratap Singh: Kamal's business rival; Malini's husband; Ranvijay, Kavya and Preeti's father (2017)
 Unknown as Malini Rajan Pratap Singh: Rajan's wife; Ranvijay, Kavya and Preeti's mother (2017)
 Simran Khanna as Kavya Singh: Malini and Rajan's daughter; Ranvijay and Kavya's sister (2017)
 Sakshi Sharma as Preeti Singh: Malini and Rajan's daughter; Ranvijay and Preeti's sister (2017)
 Drisha Kalyani as Paakhi Trivedi: Chakor's friend (2017–2019) (Dead)
 Chahat Tewani as Young Paakhi Trivedi (2017)
 Mahi Sharma as Manju Bhatia (2018)
 Keith Sequeira as Karan Oberoi (2018) (Dead)
 Kiran Janjani as Abhay Singhania (2018)
 Abhilash Choudhary as Ankush: Abhay's assistant (2018)
 Mahesh Thakur as Colonel Yashwant Bedi: Kanchan's brother; Naina's father; Imli's gun dealer; Gumaan's boss (2018) (Dead)
 Swati Kapoor as Naina Bedi: Yashwant's daughter; Chakor and Suraj's friend (2018)
 Kajal Pisal as Kanchan Bedi: Yashwant's sister (2018)
 Mohammad Nazim as Gumaan Singh Rajvanshi: Bharat's son; Bhagya, Suraj, Ragini and Vivaan's cousin; Mahendra, Narendra and Vaani's brother; Yashwant's former assistant; Garima's husband; Rohan's father (2018)
 Abhishek Verma as Mahendra Singh Rajvanshi: Bharat's son; Bhagya, Suraj, Ragini and Vivaan's cousin; Gumaan, Narendra and Vaani's brother; Vatsala's husband (2018)
 Sabina Jat as Advocate Vaani Rajvanshi: Bharat's daughter; Bhagya, Suraj, Ragini and Vivaan's cousin; Gumaan, Mahendra and Narendra's sister (2018)
 Aastha Singh as Garima Rajvanshi: Gumaan's wife; Rohan's mother (2018)
 Unknown as Rohan Rajvanshi: Garima and Gumaan's son (2018)
 Unknown as Narendra Singh Rajvanshi: Bharat's son; Bhagya, Suraj, Ragini and Vivaan's cousin; Gumaan, Mahendra and Vaani's brother; Madhuri's husband (2018)
 Unknown as Madhuri Rajvanshi: Narendra's wife (2018)
 Unknown as Vatsala Rajvanshi: Mahendra's wife (2018)
 Neeraj Pandey as Keshav "Kesho" Dave (2018)
 Komal Sharma as Sugna Dave (2018)
 Avisha Shahu as Tuntun Jagabandhi: Saanvi's friend (2018)
 Pratima Kazmi as Rajeshwari Devi Singh: Politician; Vikram and Akash's mother (2018) (Dead)
 Mukul Harish as Vikram Singh: Rajeshwari's son; Akash's brother (2018)
 Micckey Dudaaney as Bachcha Pandey: Rajeshwari and Vikram's assistant (2018)
 Minal Mogam as Rajjo: Chakor's friend (2018)
 Unknown as Ramesh Desai: Tejaswini's brother; Amit, Arvind and Jyoti's father (2018)
 Amika Shail as Jyoti Desai Singh: Ramesh's daughter; Amit and Arvind's sister; Bhagya, Suraj and Ragini's cousin; Akash's wife (2018–2019)
 Manish Naggdev as Akash Singh: Rajeshwari's son; Vikram's brother; Jyoti's husband (2018–2019)
 Unknown as Amit Desai: Ramesh's son; Bhagya, Suraj and Ragini's cousin; Arvind and Jyoti's brother (2018)
 Unknown as Arvind Desai: Ramesh's son; Amit and Jyoti's brother; Bhagya, Suraj and Ragini's cousin (2018)
 Karan Mehat as ACP Damodar Chauhan (2018–2019)
 Sanjai Gandhi as Bhanu Pratap Singh (2019)
 Unknown as Lallan Singh (2019)
 Anurag Sharma as Jatin Shroff (2019)
 Arti Singh as Poonam Shroff (2019)
 Barsha Chatterjee as Jaya Sharma: Manoj's wife; Sameer and Vanshika's mother (2019)
 Digvijay Purohit as Manoj Sharma: Deepali's brother; Jaya's husband; Sameer and Vanshika's father (2019)
 Prachi Singh as Vanshika Sharma: Jaya and Manoj's daughter; Sameer's sister; Abhiraj's cousin (2019)
 Ashish Trivedi as Prakash Ahuja: Sameer's friend (2019)
 Shantanu Verma as Abhiraj Dixit: Deepali's son; Sameer and Vanshika's cousin (2019)
 Divya Bhatnagar as Deepali Sharma Dixit: Manoj's sister; Abhiraj's mother (2019)

Special appearances
 Vidya Balan, to promote Hamari Adhuri Kahani and Kahaani 2
 Nawazuddin Siddiqui, to promote Manjhi - The Mountain Man
 Ranveer Singh, to promote Bajirao Mastani
 Salman Khan and Anushka Sharma, to promote Sultan
 Shah Rukh Khan and Anushka Sharma, to promote Jab Harry Met Sejal
 Helly Shah as Swara Sanskaar Maheshwari from Swaragini
 Jigyasa Singh as Thapki Bihaan Pandey Kumar from Thapki Pyar Ki Manish Goplani as Bihaan Pandey Kumar from Thapki Pyar Ki Toral Rasputra as Anandi Shiv Shekhar from Balika Vadhu Gracy Goswami as Nandini "Nimboli" Shekhar from Balika Vadhu Harshad Chopda as Aditya Hooda from Bepannaah Jennifer Winget as Zoya Siddiqui Arora from Bepannah Karan Wahi as himself for special dance performance
 Krystle D'Souza as herself for special dance performance
 Rohan Gandotra as Parth Bhanushali from Dil Se Dil Tak Rashami Desai as Shorvori Bhattacharya Bhanushali from Dil Se Dil Tak Jannat Zubair Rahmani as Pankti Sharma from Tu Aashiqui Ritvik Arora as Ahaan Dhanrajgir from Tu AashiquiProduction
It replaced the long-running series Madhubala: Ek Ishq Ek Junoon. The show was produced by Bollywood filmmaker Mahesh Bhatt and was based on his unreleased movie of the same name.

ReceptionUdaan was the fourth longest-running Indian television series of Colors TV after Balika Vadhu, Sasural Simar Ka and Uttaran''. With more than 1300 episodes, it was one of the longest running Indian television series.

Crossover episodes

References

External links

2014 Indian television series debuts
Colors TV original programming
Hindi-language television shows
Indian drama television series
Indian television series
Indian television soap operas
Television shows set in Uttar Pradesh